A list of films produced in South Korea in 2002:

Box office
The highest-grossing South Korean films released in 2002, by domestic box office gross revenue, are as follows:

Released

References

External links
 2002 in South Korea
 2002 in South Korean music

 2002 at www.koreanfilm.org

2002
Box
South Korean